Fabio Concas (born 17 November 1986) is an Italian footballer who plays for the Serie D side Derthona as a winger.

Career
Born in Genoa, Liguria, Concas started his career at Serie D team Savona from nearby town. In 2007–08 season he was signed by Carrarese (in co-ownership deal from Lucchese) and on 1 September 2008 signed by Ternana.

In January 2011 he was signed by Serie B club Varese in a -year contract.

On 20 July 2011 he was signed by Carpi in another co-ownership deal.

On 7 September 2013 he scored a goal that made him part of history: it was the first goal scored by Carpi in Serie B.

In January 2015, it was revealed that Concas had tested positive for Cocaine metabolite Benzoylecgonine following a routine anti-doping test that took place after the 1-0 victory over rivals Modena on 13 December 2014. On 20 January 2015, Carpi announced the termination of Concas' contract, Concas' final game for the Biancorossi was the 1-1 draw with Virtus Lanciano on 19 December 2014.

On 25 July 2019, he joined Gozzano on a 2-year contract.

On 1 September 2020 he signed with Derthona.

References

External links
Football.it Profile  
Lega Serie B Profile 

1986 births
Footballers from Genoa
Living people
Italian footballers
Association football midfielders
Savona F.B.C. players
Carrarese Calcio players
Ternana Calcio players
S.S.D. Varese Calcio players
A.C. Carpi players
A.C. Gozzano players
A.S.D. HSL Derthona players
Serie B players
Serie C players
Serie D players
Doping cases in association football
Italian sportspeople in doping cases